Olga Maria Aikala (née Westerlund; June 21, 1883 – December 15, 1962) was a Finnish horologist who served as the CEO of Aikalan Kello ja Kulta Oy.

References

1883 births
1962 deaths
Finnish businesspeople
Finnish watchmakers (people)